The Penny Red was a British postage stamp, issued in 1841. It succeeded the Penny Black and continued as the main type of postage stamp in the United Kingdom of Great Britain and Ireland until 1879, with only minor changes to the design during that time.  The colour was changed from black to red because of difficulty in seeing a cancellation mark on the Penny Black; a black cancellation mark was readily visible on a Penny Red.

History
Initially, the same plates used to print the Penny Black were used to print the Penny Red. About 21 billion Penny Reds were printed by Messrs. Perkins, Bacon & Co. The stamp had no perforations, and had to be cut from the sheet using scissors in the same manner as for the Penny Black and the early printings of the Two pence blue. Perforations (experimental gauge 16) first came into use in 1850 and were officially adopted in 1854 (in the same size as the experimental issue). The experimental perforated issue can be distinguished from the general issue as the later was applied to stamp which used a different alphabet type for the letters in the lower corners. Each stamp has unique corner letters AA, AB, AC ... AL etc., so its position on the plate can be identified.

In January 1855, the perforation size was changed from 16 to 14 as it was found that the sheets were coming apart too easily. The reduced size allowed the sheets to remain intact until pressure was applied to force the separation.

The stamps were printed in sheets of 240 (20 rows of 12 stamps), so one row cost 1 shilling and a complete sheet one pound. This 240 stamps per sheet configuration continued with all low-value British postage stamps issued until decimalisation, when the sheet size was changed to 200 (20 rows of 10 stamps), making the lowest value denomination (half penny) one pound per sheet.

Plate numbers
On 1 April 1864, the stamp was issued with the plate number engraved in the design, in the left and right side lace work. At this time, the stars in the top corners were also replaced with the same check letters as used in the lower corners, but in reverse order.

Because of wear, over 400 different plates were used to print the Penny Red. Two different basic watermarks were used for the paper, small crown, (on the early issues) and large crown, introduced on 15 May 1855. The first stamps printed on the large crown watermarked paper showed two small vertical lines in the central portion of the crown. Later printings showed a revised watermark on which these central lines are not present.

Stamps from some of the individual plate numbers, such as plate 77, are very rare and in 2016, an example from this plate was auctioned for £495,000 STG.

Withdrawal
The era of the Penny Red came to its close at the end of 1879, along with Perkins Bacon's contract. It was superseded by the Penny Venetian Red printed by De La Rue, which was in use for a little over a year before being succeeded in turn by the long-lived Penny Lilac. Since then, the stamp has become in demand amongst stamp collectors.

Chronology
 10 February 1841 – first issue: colour of 1d stamp changed from black to red-brown.
 24 February 1854 – perforations 16 introduced.
 January 1855 – perforation size changed from 16 to 14.
 15 May 1855 – watermark changed from small crown to large crown.
 1858 – letters in all four corners, colour lake-red
 1 April 1864 – letters on all four corners and plate number engraved on each stamp from plate 71 onwards.
 27 October 1879 – last plate (225) put to press.
 3 December 1879 – contract to print the Penny Red formally ended.

See also
 Archer Roulette
 List of British postage stamps
 List of notable postage stamps
 Postage stamps and postal history of Great Britain

References and sources
Notes

Sources
Stanley Gibbons Ltd, Specialised Stamp Catalogue Volume 1: Queen Victoria
J.B. Seymour & C. Gardiner-Hill The Postage Stamps of Great Britain Part 1 (Royal Philatelic Society London, 3rd. edition, 1967)
W.R.D. Wiggins (Ed.)  The Postage Stamps of Great Britain Part 2 (Royal Philatelic Society London, 2nd edition, 1962)

External links

 Examples of Penny Reds from the Phillips Collection (via Wayback Machine)
 Penny Red Collector
 Plate 77
 Article by Robert Murray, aimed at novices.

Postage stamps of the United Kingdom
1841 introductions
Cultural depictions of Queen Victoria